Chishui is a mountainous town and one of eleven fourth-order administrative divisions under the jurisdiction of northwest Dehua County, Quanzhou, Fujian, China, located 33 kilometres from the county seat and home to a species of Apanteles (Apanteles opacus).

Chishui has Jiuxian Mountain in its administrative town boundaries. Daiyun Mountain (also known as Yingxue Mountain) is another mountain in Daiyun, a village administered under Chishui. Daiyun Mountain is 1856 metres tall, takes up 35 km2, and is heavily vegetated, protected and trailed. It is known as 'the ridge of Mid-Fujian' and overlooks Alishan mountain ranges in Taiwan. Huangshan pine trees are scattered over the mountain. Chishui also has a ceramics museum and a location on the Taoxian River.

The town has a humid-subtropical climate (Cfb) on the Köppen climate classification.

The town's county had a local bridge and road construction company in Suling Village.

The construction company, the town's economic and social affairs center and the town's agricultural center were  cancelled by the county government on February 4, 2021.

The town has 12,038 mu (8.03 km2) of arable land and at least 18 more attractions other than the two mountains mentioned above. , it administers Chishui Residential Community and the following fourteen villages:
Daiyun Village
Dongli Village
Suban Village
Menghu Village
Huling Village
Lingbian Village
Fuquan Village
Jiling Village
Yongjia Village
Suling Village
Xiyang Village
Jinyang Village
Xiaoming Village
Ming'ai Village

References 

Township-level divisions of Fujian
Dehua County